Culgoa County is one of the 141 Cadastral divisions of New South Wales. It is bounded by the Warrego River in the west, and the Culgoa River in the east.

The name Culgoa is of unknown origin.

Parishes within this county
A full list of parishes found within this county; their current LGA and mapping coordinates to the approximate centre of each location is as follows:

References

Counties of New South Wales